The 2013 Winston-Salem Open was a men's tennis tournament played on outdoor hard courts. It was the 45th edition of the Winston-Salem Open (as successor to previous tournaments in New Haven and Long Island), and was part of the ATP World Tour 250 Series of the 2013 ATP World Tour. It took place at the Wake Forest University in Winston-Salem, North Carolina, United States, from August 18 through August 24, 2013. It was the last event on the 2013 US Open Series before the 2013 US Open.

Ninth-seeded Jürgen Melzer won the singles title.

Singles main-draw entrants

Seeds

 Rankings are as of August 12, 2013

Other entrants
The following players received wildcards into the singles main draw:
  Tomáš Berdych
  Romain Bogaerts
  Mardy Fish
  Fernando Verdasco

The following players received entry from the qualifying draw:
  Thiemo de Bakker
  David Goffin
  Steve Johnson
  Frederik Nielsen

Withdrawals
Before the tournament
  Tomáš Berdych (right shoulder injury)
  Carlos Berlocq
  Nikolay Davydenko
  Marcel Granollers
  Tommy Haas
  John Isner (hip injury)
  Albert Ramos
  Viktor Troicki (suspension)
  Horacio Zeballos

Retirements
  Thiemo de Bakker (toe injury)
  Mardy Fish (unwell)
  Gaël Monfils (left hip injury)
  Jack Sock (right leg injury)

Doubles main-draw entrants

Seeds

 Rankings are as of August 12, 2013

Other entrants
The following pairs received wildcards into the doubles main draw:
  Eric Butorac  /  Frederik Nielsen
  James Cerretani  /  Robin Haase

The following pair received entry as alternates:
  Jaroslav Levinský /  Lu Yen-hsun

Withdrawals
Before the tournament
  Édouard Roger-Vasselin (ankle injury)

Champions

Singles

 Jürgen Melzer def.  Gaël Monfils, 6–3, 2–1, ret.

Doubles

 Daniel Nestor /  Leander Paes def.  Treat Huey /  Dominic Inglot, 7-6(12-10), 7-5

References

External links
Official website

2013 ATP World Tour
2013 US Open Series
2013 in American tennis
August 2013 sports events in the United States
2013